Samo Tomášik (pseudonyms Kozodolský, Tomášek; February 8, 1813 – September 10, 1887) was a Slovak romantic poet and prosaist.

He was best known for writing the 1834 poem, "Hej, Slováci", which was in use since 1944 - under the title of "Hej, Sloveni" - as the national anthem of Yugoslavia and later Serbia and Montenegro until 2006. It was also the national anthem of the First Slovak Republic from 1939 to 1945 as original version "Hej, Slováci"

Early life and education
Tomášik was born in Jelšavská Teplica, now Gemerské Teplice. His is education began in Jelšava and Gemer. He studied at secondary school in Rožňava and later he continued with studies on lyceum in Kežmarok, Kraków and Wieliczka. Upon completing his studies he worked for two years as an educator in Bánréve, but when his father got sick he returned home and after his death became a Lutheran pastor in Chyžné. When he left to Germany to finish his education, he was supplied by Samo Chalupka. In years 1856 - 1860 he became education supervisor and on his behalf was established the first Slovak high school in Revúca.

Career
Tomášik belongs to the period between Kollár and Štúr generation. His first works were Latin poetry, but he was also interested in folklore. Besides Latin he wrote in Slovak and Czech. In his work can be often found challenge to fight for freedom or justice, endeavor to prove the importance of the Slovak nation in the history of the Kingdom of Hungary. He also attended to satyric, marital and folklore poetry. He places his writings on the region of Muráň and Gemer. His works are distinguished by musicality and folk language and many of them have become traditional. He died in Chyžné.

List of writings

 1888 - Básně a písně, collective writing
 1834 - Hej, Slováci (original name Na Slovany), hymnic song and former anthem of Yugoslavia and the Slovak Republic during WW2
 1846 - Hladomra, the first prose (legend)
 1864 - Bašovci na Muránskom zámku, tale
 1865 - Sečovci, veľmoži gemerskí, tale
 1867 - Vešelínovo dobytie Muráňa, tale
 1870 - Odboj Vešelínov, tale
 1873 - Malkotenti, tale
 1876 - Kuruci, tale
 1872 - Pamäti gemersko-malohontské, factual writing about the Gemer history
 1883 - Denkwürdigkeiten des Muranyer Schlosses, mit Bezug auf die Vaterländische Geschichte, factual history of the Muráň Castle
 Barón Trenck, leader of the pandoors, unfinished novel (only manuscript)
 Svadba pod Kohoutem, drama (only manuscript)
 Kolo Tatier čierňava, revolutionary song
 Hej, pod Kriváňom (originally Hej, pod Muráňom), nationalized song
 Ja som bača veľmi starý

References

External links
  Gemerčan Samo Tomášik – autor hymny všetkých Slovanov (retrieved on 2008-10-31)

1813 births
1887 deaths
People from Revúca District
Slovak poets
Slovak Lutherans
19th-century poets
National anthem writers
19th-century Lutherans